Krajišnici (pl.) is a Serbo-Croatian word meaning "frontiersmen". It may refer to:

 Krajišnici (Loznica), a village in Serbia
 Grenz infantry, light infantry troops from the Military Frontier of the Habsburg Monarchy
 Regional name ("people of Krajina") for the population from the territories of the former Croatian and Slavonian Military Frontiers
 Informal name for Serbs of Croatia
 Regional name for people from the region of Bosanska Krajina
 Regional name for people from the region of Timočka Krajina
 Designation for people from the former Republic of Serbian Krajina

See also
 Krajišnik (disambiguation)
 Krajina, a Slavic toponym, meaning frontier or march